The 2014 European Open Water Swimming Championships was the fifteenth edition of the European Open Water Swimming Championships (was part of the 2014 European Aquatics Championships) and took part from 13–17 August 2014 in Berlin, Germany.

Results

Men

Women

Team event

See also
 2014 European Aquatics Championships
 List of medalists at the European Open Water Swimming Championships

References

External links
 Ligue Européenne de Natation LEN Official Website

European Open Water Swimming Championships
European Open Water Championships